Isidor Torkar (born 17 August 1960 in Slovenia) is a Swedish actor. He started his career in 1975 when he started as amateur actor at Skånska teatern in Landskrona where he was engaged until 1982 when he became a professional actor.

Filmography

Film
Bornholms stemme (1999)
Vuxna människor (1999)
Den 5:e kvinnan (2002)
Frostbiten (2006)

Television
Macklean (1993)
Faceless Killers (1994)
Döda danskar räknas inte (1994)
Sveriges Television's Christmas calendar (1996-2000)
Fru Marianne (2001)
Dolly & Dolly (1998)
Wallander (2005-2006)
Emblas hemlighet (2006)

References

External links
Official website

Swedish Film Database

Swedish male actors
Living people
1960 births